Arthur Ashe was the defending champion, but did not participate this year.

Stan Smith won the title, defeating Tom Okker 6–4, 6–3 in the final.

Seeds

  Stan Smith (champion)
  Ilie Năstase (semifinals)
  Tom Okker (final)
  Marty Riessen (semifinals)

Draw

Finals

Top half

Section 1

Section 2

Bottom half

Section 3

Section 4

External links
 Main draw

Stockholm Open
1972 Grand Prix (tennis)